George Barry Ford (October 28, 1885 – August 1, 1978) was an American Roman Catholic priest, advocate of civil rights, and the chaplain who, along with Fr. Moore, led Thomas Merton to the Roman Catholic Church. He was twice silenced by Cardinal Francis Spellman, and was a close friend of Eleanor Roosevelt and Carlton J. H. Hayes. Dr. Henry P. Van Dusen, then president of Union Theological Seminary next to Corpus Christi, described Father Ford as "the best known and best loved man in the Morningside Heights community".

Ford worked to establish the research institute and think tank Freedom House along with Eleanor Roosevelt, Wendell Willkie, Mayor Fiorello La Guardia, Elizabeth Cutter Morrow, Dorothy Thompson, Herbert Agar, Herbert Bayard Swope, Ralph Bunche, Roscoe Drummond, and Rex Stout. He also helped establish the Church Peace Union that today is the Carnegie Council for Ethics in International Affairs (New York Times obituary). Ford was a disciple of educational reformer John Dewey, who was a professor at Columbia's Teacher's College, and he eventually received the John Dewey Award.

In 1938, Thomas Merton sought Ford out at Corpus Christi Church to seek instruction in the Catholic faith. That same year, when Servant of God Catherine Doherty, Baroness de Hueck, arrived in New York, he gave her free rent in Harlem, which was a key to her success in establishing Friendship House that became a key center of the future Madonna House Apostolate. He also contributed frequently to her support.

In 1954 he received an honorary Doctor of Humane Letters (L.H.D.) degree from Columbia University. He also received honorary degrees from Manhattan College and Seton Hall College.

In 1966 he served on the historic Ad hoc Commission on Rights of Soviet Jews. It was chaired by Bayard Rustin, and established by the Conference on the Status of Soviet Jews, offering a public tribunal on Jewish life in the Soviet Union.

Fr. Ford is thanked in the liner notes to George Carlin's 1972 album Class Clown, for although Carlin rejected the Catholic faith, he remembered Ford with cultural appreciation, and credited him for teaching him how to ask questions and think.

Ford was an early champion of the Catholic Ordination of Women.

Awards
 Congregation B'nai Jeshurun (1948)
 John Dewey Award of the New York Teachers Guild (1959)
 William J. Schieffelin Award of the Citizens Union of New York (1963)
 International Student Council (1964)
 National Conference of Christians and Jews, Brotherhood Award (1965)

Further reading

References 

1885 births
1978 deaths
20th-century Roman Catholics
Activists from New York (state)
American Christian socialists
American anti-war activists
20th-century American memoirists
American anti-poverty advocates
Catholic socialists
Catholics from New York (state)
Christian radicals
Converts to Roman Catholicism from Anglicanism
Nonviolence advocates
Morningside Heights, Manhattan
Upper West Side
People of the Roman Catholic Archdiocese of New York
Roman Catholic activists